William Massey (1856–1925) was Prime Minister of New Zealand.

William Massey may also refer to:
Bill Massey (baseball) (1871–1940), baseball player in 1894
Bill Massey (softball) (1936–2020), New Zealand softball player, coach and umpire
William Massey (calligrapher) (1691–1764), author of The origin and progress of letters (London: J. Johnson, 1763).
William Massey (cricketer) (1846–1899), played cricket for Somerset and Lancashire
William Massey (rower) (1817–1898), rowed and played cricket for Cambridge University
William A. Massey (politician) (1856–1914), U.S. Senator
William A. Massey (mathematician) (born 1956), American mathematician
William Clifford Massey (1917–1974), American anthropologist
William Nathaniel Massey (1809–1881), British author and politician
William S. Massey (1920–2017), American mathematician